Z. G. Muhammad is an Indian writer.

Early life, writings and education

Zahid G. Muhammad was born in Nowhatta in the Srinagar district of Jammu and Kashmir, India into a Kashmiri Muslim family. After graduating from Islamia High School, he obtained a Bachelor of Science degree and a Master of Arts degree in English literature from the Islamia College of Science and Commerce of Kashmir University, followed by a course in mass communication from the Indian Institute of Mass Communication in Jammu. Currently, he is an editor of Peace Watch Kashmir, a journal dedicated to peace in South Asia, and a regular columnist for Greater Kashmir, Srinagar.

The author has contributed articles on politics literature, culture, and history in various newspapers like; The Statesman, the Onlooker, Bombay, the Sunday Calcutta, The Free Press Journal, Kashmir Times, Journal of Peace Studies, New Delhi, The News, The Post, The Pakistan Observer, The Washington Post, Tehran Times, The Arab News, and the Urdu Times.

As columnist

During 1982–1990, he wrote a weekly column for the Press Asia International, New Delhi, and reviewed books on Kashmir history, literature and politics.

Zahid worked as executive editor, for Kashmir Observer between 1997 and 2004.

He contributed a permanent column Punchline on politics, culture and literature for the Greater Kashmir between 1988 and 1995. Also, he also wrote a permanent column, The Media-line on print and electronic media in the Greater Kashmir. Then later in March 2006, he resumed writing a weekly political column Punchline in the Greater Kashmir.

Participations

Zahid G Muhammad has participated and chaired many international conferences on Kashmir in London,
Washington, D.C.,  and Montevideo, which were regarding the resolution of the Kashmir conflict between India and Pakistan.

Production

Muhammad wrote many short stories in Kashmiri and English. He also produced and wrote documentaries for Doordarshan Kashir.

Some prominent ones were:

New tracts (a 5 episode documentary on economic treasures of Jammu and Kashmir).
Unity is diversity (a ten-episode documentary on different ethnic groups of J&K).
Reshi Tradition of Kashmir (six-episode documentary on the patron saint of Kashmir: Sheikh Noor-u-Din - Reshi tradition).
 'Literary Legacy of Kashmir'  (a six-episode documentary on the literary history of Kashmir).
Hamare Sufi Shaer'  (a ten episode documentary on Sufi Poets of Kashmir).
Boatman of Kashmir (a two-episode documentary on the anthropological study of boatman of Kashmir for Doordarshan national network).
Monuments of Kashmir (Documentary for Doordarshan National network in English).
'''Nagama-Firdous'  (a musical program).Poets of Kashmir' (From Mahjoor to Rehman Rahi) in 2001.''
Qaiser Mirza – Journalist with a difference (Documentary).

Books

Can National Conference Survive? 1978.
The Cindering Chinars, a collection of English short stories On Kashmir Struggle For Freedom 1996.
The Icons of Kashmir Identity Published By Gulshan Publishers 2007
Kashmir in War and Diplomacy Published by Gulshan Publishers 2007.
Living Uncertainties: Kashmir, Problem and People.
Srinagar – My City My Dreamland.
Kashmir Story - Hope & Despair.
Kashmir Changing Shades.

Awards
2012 29th Ahad Zargar Award for Contribution to the Heritage Literature of Kashmir.
2008 Gulshan Publication Award.

References

1948 births
Indian people of Kashmiri descent
Kashmiri people
Living people
Indian columnists
Journalists from Jammu and Kashmir
Indian political journalists
People from Srinagar district
University of Kashmir alumni